Ablie Jallow (born 14 November 1998) is a Gambian professional footballer who plays as a winger for Ligue 2 club Metz, and the Gambia national team.

Club career
Jallow was born in Bundung, and spent his early career with Real de Banjul and Génération Foot.

In July 2017, Jallow signed a five-year contract with Ligue 1 side Metz. In September 2019 he moved on loan to Ajaccio. In August 2020, Jallow again left Metz on loan, joining Belgian club Seraing along with five other Metz loanees.

International career
Jallow made his international debut for Gambia in 2015. On 12 January 2021, Jallow scored Gambia's first ever Africa Cup of Nations goal in a 1–0 win over Mauritania.

International goals
Scores and results list Gambia's goal tally first, score column indicates score after each Jallow goal.

References

1998 births
Living people
Association football midfielders
Gambian footballers
The Gambia international footballers
Real de Banjul FC players
Génération Foot players
FC Metz players
AC Ajaccio players
R.F.C. Seraing (1922) players
Ligue 1 players
Ligue 2 players
2021 Africa Cup of Nations players
Gambian expatriate footballers
Gambian expatriate sportspeople in Senegal
Expatriate footballers in Senegal
Gambian expatriate sportspeople in France
Expatriate footballers in France
Gambian expatriate sportspeople in Belgium
Expatriate footballers in Belgium
Belgian Pro League players
Challenger Pro League players